Hamun County is in Sistan and Baluchestan province, Iran. The capital of the county is the city of Mohammadabad. At the 2006 census, the region's population (as Shib Ab District of Zabol County) was 43,374 in 9,809 households. The following census in 2011 counted 41,520 people in 10,623 households. At the 2016 census, the county's population was 41,017 in 11,380 households, by which time the district had been separated from the county to form Hamun County.

Administrative divisions

The population history and structural changes of Hamun County's administrative divisions over three consecutive censuses are shown in the following table. The latest census shows two districts, four rural districts, and two cities.

References

 

Counties of Sistan and Baluchestan Province